Acetropis is a genus of true bugs.

References 

Stenodemini
Hemiptera of North America
Insects described in 1858
Hemiptera genera